Stavsjø is a village in Ringsaker Municipality in Innlandet county, Norway. Stavsjø Church is located in the village.

References

Ringsaker
Villages in Innlandet